The 1956 Liège–Bastogne–Liège was the 42nd edition of the Liège–Bastogne–Liège cycle race and was held on 6 May 1956. The race started and finished in Liège. The race was won by Fred De Bruyne.

General classification

References

1956
1956 in Belgian sport
1956 Challenge Desgrange-Colombo